Tatyana Khlyzova (born 10 March 1981) is a Kazakhstani ice hockey player. She competed in the women's tournament at the 2002 Winter Olympics.

References

1981 births
Living people
Kazakhstani women's ice hockey players
Olympic ice hockey players of Kazakhstan
Ice hockey players at the 2002 Winter Olympics
Sportspeople from Almaty